Acklington is a railway station on the East Coast Main Line, which runs between  and . It is owned by Network Rail and managed by Northern Trains. It is the currently the least-used station in Northumberland, with an estimated 66 passenger journeys made during 2020/21.

History
The station was opened on 1 July 1847 by the Newcastle and Berwick Railway. It later joined the North Eastern Railway, becoming part of the London and North Eastern Railway during the Grouping of 1923. The line then passed on to the North Eastern Region of British Railways on nationalisation in 1948.

When Sectorisation was introduced, the station was served by Regional Railways until the Privatisation of British Railways. Intercity Sector trains passed through on the East Coast Main Line.

The station has a substantial main building on the northbound side, which is Grade-II listed and now used as a private residence. It also had a goods yard and signal box. Electrification of the ECML and a rolling stock shortage led to the timetable being cut to the present residual level in 1991.

Facilities
The station is unstaffed (so tickets must be purchased in advance or on the train) and only has basic amenities - a sizeable stone shelter and payphone on the southbound platform and a cycle rack on the northbound side. Step-free access is available to both platforms.

Services

All Services at Acklington are operated by Northern Trains using  and  DMUs.

Both services on weekdays and the morning service on Saturdays continue beyond Newcastle to  via .

No services call at the station on Sundays.

References

Sources

External links 

Railway stations in Northumberland
DfT Category F2 stations
Former North Eastern Railway (UK) stations
Railway stations in Great Britain opened in 1847
Northern franchise railway stations
Low usage railway stations in the United Kingdom
1847 establishments in England
John and Benjamin Green buildings and structures